Troglohyphantes is a genus of  sheet weavers that was first described by G. Joseph in 1881. The genus name is a combination of the Ancient Greek  (troglo-), meaning "cave (dweller)", and -hyphantes, a common ending for linyphiid genera.

Species
 it contains 134 species and five subspecies, found in Europe, Africa, Siberia, Georgia, Czechia, and Iran:

T. adjaricus Tanasevitch, 1987 – Caucasus (Russia, Georgia)
T. affinis (Kulczyński, 1914) – Croatia, Bosnia and Herzegovina
T. affirmatus (Simon, 1913) – Spain
T. albicaudatus Bosmans, 2006 – Algeria
T. albopictus Pesarini, 1989 – Italy
T. alluaudi Fage, 1919 – Spain
T. apenninicus Isaia, Mammola & Pantini, 2017 – Italy
T. balazuci Dresco, 1956 – France
T. birsteini Charitonov, 1947 – Russia, Georgia
T. bolivarorum Machado, 1939 – Spain
T. bolognai Brignoli, 1975 – Italy
T. bornensis Isaia & Pantini, 2008 – Italy
T. boudewijni Deeleman-Reinhold, 1974 – Montenegro
T. brevipes Deeleman-Reinhold, 1978 – Bosnia and Herzegovina
T. brignolii Deeleman-Reinhold, 1978 – Italy, Croatia
T. bureschianus Deltshev, 1975 – Bulgaria
T. caecus Fage, 1919 – France
T. caligatus Pesarini, 1989 – Switzerland, Italy
T. cantabricus Simon, 1911 – Spain
T. caporiaccoi Brignoli, 1971 – Italy
T. cavadinii Pesarini, 1989 – Italy
T. cerberus (Simon, 1884) – Spain, France
T. charitonovi Tanasevitch, 1987 – Russia
T. cirtensis (Simon, 1910) – Algeria
T. comottii Pesarini, 1989 – Italy
T. confusus Kratochvíl, 1939 – Eastern Europe
T. croaticus (Chyzer, 1894) – Eastern Europe
T. cruentus Brignoli, 1971 – Slovenia
T. dalmaticus (Kulczyński, 1914) – Croatia, Macedonia
T. deelemanae Tanasevitch, 1987 – Georgia
T. dekkingae Deeleman-Reinhold, 1978 – Bosnia and Herzegovina
Troglohyphantes d. pauciaculeatus Deeleman-Reinhold, 1978 – Bosnia and Herzegovina
T. diabolicus Deeleman-Reinhold, 1978 – Slovenia
T. dinaricus (Kratochvíl, 1948) – Croatia
T. diurnus Kratochvíl, 1932 – Austria, Slovenia, Croatia
T. dominici Pesarini, 1988 – Italy
T. draconis Deeleman-Reinhold, 1978 – Macedonia
T. drenskii Deltshev, 1973 – Bulgaria
T. excavatus Fage, 1919 – Italy, Austria, Eastern Europe
T. exul Thaler, 1987 – Italy
T. fagei Roewer, 1931 – Germany, Austria, Italy
T. fallax Deeleman-Reinhold, 1978 – Bosnia and Herzegovina
T. fatalis Pesarini, 1988 – Italy
T. fugax (Kulczyński, 1914) – Bosnia and Herzegovina
T. furcifer (Simon, 1884) – Spain
T. gamsi Deeleman-Reinhold, 1978 – Slovenia
T. gestroi Fage, 1933 – Italy
T. giachinoi Isaia & Mammola, 2018 – Italy
T. giromettai (Kulczyński, 1914) – Croatia
T. gladius Wunderlich, 1995 – Turkey
T. gracilis Fage, 1919 – Slovenia
T. gregori (Miller, 1947) – Czech Rep.
T. hadzii Kratochvíl, 1934 – Bosnia and Herzegovina
T. helsdingeni Deeleman-Reinhold, 1978 – Austria, Slovenia
T. henroti Dresco, 1956 – France
T. herculanus (Kulczyński, 1894) – Eastern Europe
T. inermis Deeleman-Reinhold, 1978 – Macedonia
T. iulianae Brignoli, 1971 – Italy
T. jamatus Roewer, 1931 – Slovenia
T. jeanneli Dumitrescu & Georgescu, 1970 – Romania
T. juris Thaler, 1982 – Italy
T. karawankorum Deeleman-Reinhold, 1978 – Austria, Slovenia
T. karolianus Topçu, Türkes & Seyyar, 2008 – Turkey
T. konradi Brignoli, 1975 – Italy
T. kordunlikanus Deeleman-Reinhold, 1978 – Croatia
T. kratochvili Drensky, 1935 – Macedonia
T. labrada Wunderlich, 2012 – Canary Is.
T. lanai Isaia & Pantini, 2010 – Italy
T. latzeli Thaler, 1986 – Austria
T. lesserti Kratochvíl, 1935 – SE Europe (Balkans)
T. lessinensis Caporiacco, 1936 – Italy
T. liburnicus Caporiacco, 1927 – SE Europe (Balkans)
T. lucifer Isaia, Mammola & Pantini, 2017 – Italy
T. lucifuga (Simon, 1884) – France, Italy, Switzerland
T. marqueti (Simon, 1884) – Spain, France
Troglohyphantes m. pauciaculeatus Simon, 1929 – France
T. microcymbium Pesarini, 2001 – Italy
T. milleri (Kratochvíl, 1948) – Bosnia and Herzegovina
T. montanus Absolon & Kratochvíl, 1932 – Bosnia and Herzegovina
T. nigraerosae Brignoli, 1971 – Italy
T. noricus (Thaler & Polenec, 1974) – Germany, Austria
T. novicordis Thaler, 1978 – Austria
T. numidus (Simon, 1911) – Algeria
T. nyctalops Simon, 1911 – Spain
T. orghidani Dumitrescu & Georgescu, 1977 – Romania
T. oromii (Ribera & Blasco, 1986) – Canary Is.
T. orpheus (Simon, 1884) – France
T. paulusi Thaler, 2002 – Iran
T. pavesii Pesarini, 1988 – Italy
T. pedemontanus (Gozo, 1908) – Italy
T. phragmitis (Simon, 1884) – France
T. pisidicus Brignoli, 1971 – Turkey
T. pluto Caporiacco, 1938 – Italy
T. poleneci Wiehle, 1964 – Italy, Slovenia
T. polyophthalmus Joseph, 1881 (type) – Slovenia
T. pretneri Deeleman-Reinhold, 1978 – Montenegro, Albania
T. pugnax Deeleman-Reinhold, 1978 – Croatia, Bosnia and Herzegovina
T. pumilio Denis, 1959 – France
T. pyrenaeus Simon, 1907 – France
T. racovitzai Dumitrescu & Georgescu, 1970 – Romania
T. regalini Pesarini, 1989 – Italy
T. roberti Deeleman-Reinhold, 1978 – Croatia
Troglohyphantes r. dalmatensis Deeleman-Reinhold, 1978 – Croatia
T. roquensis Barrientos & Fernández-Pérez, 2018 – Spain (Canary Is.)
T. ruffoi Caporiacco, 1936 – Italy
T. salax (Kulczyński, 1914) – Croatia, Bosnia and Herzegovina
T. saouaf Bosmans, 2006 – Algeria, Tunisia
T. sbordonii Brignoli, 1975 – Austria, Italy, Slovenia
T. schenkeli (Miller, 1937) – Slovakia
T. sciakyi Pesarini, 1989 – Italy
T. scientificus Deeleman-Reinhold, 1978 – Italy, Slovenia
T. similis Fage, 1919 – Slovenia
T. simoni Fage, 1919 – France
T. sketi Deeleman-Reinhold, 1978 – Slovenia, Croatia
T. solitarius Fage, 1919 – France
T. sordellii (Pavesi, 1875) – Switzerland, Italy
T. spatulifer Pesarini, 2001 – Italy
T. spinipes Fage, 1919 – Slovenia
T. strandi Absolon & Kratochvíl, 1932 – Croatia
T. subalpinus Thaler, 1967 – Germany, Austria, Slovenia, Croatia
T. svilajensis (Kratochvíl, 1948) – Croatia
Troglohyphantes s. bosnicus (Kratochvíl, 1948) – Bosnia and Herzegovina
Troglohyphantes s. noctiphilus (Kratochvíl, 1948) – Croatia
T. tauriscus Thaler, 1982 – Austria
T. thaleri Miller & Polenec, 1975 – Austria, Slovenia
T. trispinosus Miller & Polenec, 1975 – Slovenia
T. troglodytes (Kulczyński, 1914) – Croatia, Bosnia and Herzegovina
T. turcicus Topçu, Türkeş, Seyyar, Demircan & Karabulut, 2014 – Turkey
T. typhlonetiformis Absolon & Kratochvíl, 1932 – Austria, Slovenia
T. vicinus Miller & Polenec, 1975 – Slovenia
T. vignai Brignoli, 1971 – Italy
T. wiebesi Deeleman-Reinhold, 1978 – Croatia, Bosnia and Herzegovina
T. wiehlei Miller & Polenec, 1975 – Austria, Eastern Europe
T. zanoni Pesarini, 1988 – Italy

See also
 List of Linyphiidae species (Q–Z)

References

Araneomorphae genera
Linyphiidae
Spiders of Africa